Tusitala is a 1986 three-part mini series for television based on the last years in the life of Robert Louis Stevenson, when he left Great Britain for Sydney and west Samoa.

Samoa Connection
In the Samoan language Tusitala means writer of stories and it is there that Robert Louis Stevenson spent his last four years. He was buried there at Mount Vaea.

Cast
John McEnery as Robert Louis Stevenson 
Angela Punch McGregor 	
Kirk Alexander as Henley 
Dorothy Alison as Maggie 
Norman Kaye as Rev. Clarke  	
Lynn Dalby as Almelia Clarke 	
Joseph Fürst as Von Pilsarch 
John Hamblin as Dr. Eisler  
Olivia Hamnett as Lady Jersey

Production
There had been plans to film this in the 1960s by Cinesound Productions.

In 1983 producer Ray Alchin announced Ted Roberts would be the writer. The ABC deliberately aimed at an international co production. "We're branching out with an international figure," said Alchin.

The budget was $5 million.

Filming started June 1985 by which stage the writer had become Peter Yeldham. It was the only production Don Sharp ever directed in his native Australia.

References

External links

Tusitala at AustLit

1986 British television series debuts
1986 British television series endings
1980s British drama television series
Channel 4 television dramas
1980s British television miniseries
Films directed by Don Sharp
Australian Broadcasting Corporation original programming
1980s Australian television miniseries
English-language television shows
Television shows set in Scotland
Films shot in Edinburgh
Television shows set in New South Wales